The 1897 Chicago Maroons football team was an American football team that represented the University of Chicago during the 1897 Western Conference football season.  In their sixth season under head coach Amos Alonzo Stagg, the Maroons compiled an 11–1 record, finished in second place in the Western Conference with a 3–1 record against conference opponents, and outscored their opponents by a combined total of 331 to 68.

Schedule

Roster

Head Coach: Amos Alonzo Stagg (6th year at Chicago)

References

Chicago
Chicago Maroons football seasons
Chicago Maroons football